The Philadelphia Wings was one of six teams from the original National Lacrosse League. This team mimicked Philadelphia's NHL counterpart, the Flyers with its "Broad Street Bullies" style of play. The Wings played at the home of the Flyers, the Spectrum, and played their first game in that arena on May 19, 1974, mere hours after the Flyers won the Stanley Cup. The Wings were one of three teams that did not go bankrupt prior to the 1976 season cancellation.

The league only lasted two seasons. The regular season was played during the off-season of the NHL and consisted of 40 games in 1974 and 48 in 1975. Both seasons consisted of a two-round playoff with four of the six teams making the playoffs. Each round was a best-of-seven series.

The Wings were regular season champions in the first season (1974). After defeating the Maryland Arrows in the first round, they were eliminated in the final round by the Rochester Griffins four games to two in the first season. They failed to make the playoffs with a disappointing fifth-place finish (they missed the playoffs by one win).

The 1974–75 NLL is unrelated to the modern-day National Lacrosse League, which also has included two unrelated teams called the Philadelphia Wings (Philadelphia Wings (1987–2014) and Philadelphia Wings (2018–)). This was the only original league logo resurrected in the rebirth of pro indoor lacrosse. The current NLL league and franchise makes no references to the original incarnation although in 2004 there was a "retro" night in Philadelphia where the Wings wore the original orange jersey and the Rochester Knighthawks donned the Rochester Griffins jersey. Members of the original Wings were honored at a ceremony at half-time.

The players included Doug Favell (NHL goalie), John Grant Sr., the only player to play for the first two versions of the NLL Wings and father of John Grant Jr., Jimmy Wasson, goalkeeper Wayne Platt and Zeny Lipinski. Longtime Flyer television announcer Gene Hart called the games for the Wings.

1974 Players

1975 Players

KEY:
GP = Games Played
G = Goals Scored
A = Assists
Pts = Points
PIM = Penalties In Minutes

See also
Lacrosse in Pennsylvania

External links
1974-1975 National Lacrosse League film page on Lax-TV.com

Sports in Philadelphia
Lacrosse clubs established in 1974
Lacrosse teams in Pennsylvania
1974 establishments in Pennsylvania
1975 disestablishments in Pennsylvania
1974 in sports in Pennsylvania
1975 in sports in Pennsylvania
Lacrosse clubs disestablished in 1975